Domenick "Donny" Lia (born November 8, 1978) is an American stock car racing driver. He won the 2007 and 2009 NASCAR Whelen Modified Tour championships. He also won the Race of Champions Modified Tour races in 2004, 2005, 2006, and 2007. He has raced on the national level in the ARCA Re/Max Series (now ARCA Racing Series), Camping World Truck Series, and the Nationwide Series.

Early and personal life
Lia's father Don owns several car dealerships in the Long Island area along with dealerships around Buffalo, Albany and Hartford areas. Before he began his racing career, Lia competed in computer racing games online against competitors all over the world. He credits gaming for helping develop his interest in motorsports and for improving his reflexes and his hand–eye coordination.

Racing career
In 1999, Lia began racing a Legends car at Wall Stadium (Wall, New Jersey). He won several times including the track's biggest event, the prestigious Turkey Derby. In 2000, Lia continued racing his Legends car with success all over the eastern United States, scoring over 20 wins. He competed in the NASCAR Modified division at Riverhead Raceway (Riverhead, New York) and he won Rookie of the Year honors in 2001. He also made his NASCAR Modified Tour debut at Martinsville Speedway. The 2002 season was spent gaining experience for a full-time move to the NASCAR Modified Tour in 2003.

He placed in the top ten in NASCAR Featherlite Modified Series (previous name of the Whelen Modified Tour) points in 2003 on his way to another Rookie of the Year award. He claimed five poles in 2004, more than any other competitor, which earned him the Bud Pole Award. He also competed on the Race of Champions Modified Tour, taking a big victory in the second-annual North-South Shootout at Concord Motorsport Park in North Carolina. Lia continued racing his Modifieds in 2005, winning two Whelen Modified Tour races and finishing sixth in WMT season points.

In 2006, he was given his first opportunity to race in a non-modified stock car. He practiced and qualified for the Nashville Superspeedway event in the ARCA series. He won one event on the Whelen Modified Tour and two pole positions, and he won three unsanctioned events. The next season, he won six Whelen Modified Tour races including the events at Martinsville, 2 at Stafford, Thompson, New Hampshire, and Riverhead. He clinched the season points championship before the final race. On September 15, 2007 he made his first appearance in the NASCAR Craftsman Truck Series. He raced in the Bill Davis Racing No. 36 Toyota at New Hampshire, finishing 20th.

Lia had been set to drive for HT Motorsports in the No. 59 Toyota in late 2007, and drove at Homestead hoping for a full 2008 season. However, sponsorship did not pan out, and instead joined The Racer's Group (TRG) for the 2008 season, driving Kevin Buckler's No. 71 The Racer's Group/Nationrides.com/Zurich North America Chevrolet Silverado starting at Auto Club Speedway (he was ineligible to race at Daytona because of minimum driver proficiency rules, with Mike Bliss running the race). He had his first Top 10 finish at Martinsville Speedway when he finished ninth. He scored his first Craftsman Truck Series win at Mansfield in the Ohio 250 on May 24, 2008 by nudging race leader David Starr out of the way on the final lap, which is currently the only lap he has led in his Truck Series career. He was the first rookie to win a Truck Series event since Carl Edwards in the 2003 season. He was the also the first driver from Riverhead, New York to win a NASCAR national series race since Steve Park's final Cup Series win in 2001. Late in the season, Lia was released from TRG, and signed to drive for Randy Moss Motorsports for seven of the final eight races of the season.

Lia returned to the Mystic Missile in the Whelen Modified Tour in 2009, winning four times and winning his second championship. He also made his Nationwide debut at Lowe's Motor Speedway, but finished last in the No. 07 SK Motorsports Toyota Camry. He drove a part-time schedule in the No. 07 and No. 21 Chevrolet Silverados for SS-Green Light Racing in the Truck Series in 2010. He then ran three truck races for Stringer Motorsports near the end of the season.

Motorsports career results

NASCAR
(key) (Bold – Pole position awarded by qualifying time. Italics – Pole position earned by points standings or practice time. * – Most laps led.)

Nationwide Series

Camping World Truck Series

Busch North Series

Whelen Southern Modified Tour

ARCA Racing Series
(key) (Bold – Pole position awarded by qualifying time. Italics – Pole position earned by points standings or practice time. * – Most laps led.)

References

External links
 
 

Living people
1978 births
People from Jericho, New York
Racing drivers from New York (state)
NASCAR drivers